Vyacheslav Krivulets (born 27 February 1998) is a Belarusian professional footballer who plays for Bobovnya Kopyl.

References

External links 
 
 

1998 births
Living people
Belarusian footballers
Association football defenders
FC Shakhtyor Soligorsk players
FC Belshina Bobruisk players
FC Torpedo Minsk players
FC Shakhtyor Petrikov players